This is a list of radio stations that broadcast on FM frequency 100.4 MHz:

Albania
 Club FM, Tirana, a radio station based in Tirana, Albania

Belarus
 Hit FM

China 
 CNR China Traffic Radio in Hefei

France
 France Bleu, the regional radio network of Radio France

Germany
 WDR 2 a radio network produced by the Westdeutscher Rundfunk public broadcasting organization in Germany

India
  India Radio, the radio broadcaster of India and a division of Prasar Bharati

Italy
 Radio Sole, an Independent Local Radio station based in Galatina (Lecce), Southern Italy

Lithuania
 Vakarų FM

Malaysia
 Molek FM in Kuantan, Pahang
 Ai FM in Malacca and Northern Johor

Morocco
 Aswat Radio in Agadir

Netherlands
 Q-music

New Zealand
 The Most FM

Russia
 Nashe Radio, a rock music station designed to promote Russian rock bands (as opposed to pop and Western music)

South Africa 
 Radio 786, a community radio station based in Cape Town, South Africa

Sri Lanka 
 E FM, a Colombo, Sri Lanka-based radio station, playing '80s music

United Kingdom 
 Classic FM, an Independent National Radio station broadcasting popular classical music, on this frequency serving Hereford and Milton Keynes
 KMFM Medway, an Independent Local Radio serving the Medway Towns and the surrounding areas in Kent, South East England
 Smooth North West, an Independent Local Radio station based in Salford, Greater Manchester

References

Lists of radio stations by frequency